Bamna is a locality village situated about 8 km south - west from its Taluka headquarters himatnagar and lies on the bank of Hatmati Dam. It falls under the sabarkantha district Jurisdiction of Gujarat.
It is well known as the village of great poet and gem of Gujarat Umashankar Joshi, a Gujarati literate, once a President of Gujarati Sahitya Parishad.

Demographic
It got its name from Brahmins who live there... The village consists of Hindu, Muslim, and Dalit families. There are also some tribes from pottery, blacksmith, tailors, etc. backgrounds. These people all live in harmony and peace

Landmarks 
 Bamna Somnath Mahadev Temple
 Bhatt Maganlal kalidas & Laxmiram Thrivedi Hospital
 Dena Bank
 Post Office
 Ganpati Mandir
 Sangamnath Mandir
 Brahmin Samaj Wadi
 Bajrangbali Mandir
 Hathmati Jalashay
 Ramkuva & Great Balia Mahadev Mandir

References

External links

Villages in Aravalli district